Tallapaka Annamacharya (Telugu : తాళ్ళపాక అన్నమాచార్య) (IAST: taḷḷapāka annamācārya; 22 May 1408 – 4 April 1503), also popularly known as Annamayya, was a 15th-century Hindu saint and the earliest known Indian musician to compose songs called sankirtanas in praise of the Venkateswara, a form of Lord Vishnu. The musical form of the keertana songs that he composed, which are still popular among Carnatic music concert artists, have strongly influenced the structure of Carnatic music compositions. Annamacharya is remembered for his saintly life, and is honoured as a great devotee of Shree Vishnu by devotees and saintly singers.

He is believed to have been the avatar of Nandaka, the sword of Shree Hari Vishnu. He is widely regarded as the Andhra Pada kavitā Pitāmaha (Grandfather of Telugu song-writing).

Personal life
Tallapaka Annamacharya was born on Vaishakha Shuddha Pournami in the year Sarwadhari (22 May 1408) in Tallapaka, Near Rajampet Mandal, a village in present-day Kadapa district of Andhra Pradesh, India. Even though his parents belonged to the Nandavarika Brahmin community of Smarta tradition, he took initiation into Vaishnavism and became a Vaishnava in the Ramanujacharya Sampradaya. His wife, Timmakka, had written Subhadra Kalyanam, and is considered the first female poet in Telugu literature. Their son, Pedda Tirumalacharya, and grandson, Tallapaka Chinnayya, were also composers and poets. The Tallapaka compositions are considered to have dominated and influenced the structure of Carnatic music compositions. Annamacharya lived for 95 years until Phalguna Bahula (Krishna) Dvadasi (12th day after full moon) in the year Dhundhubhi (4 April 1503).

Literary career

Annamayya is said to have composed as many as 32,000 sankeertanas (songs) on the praise of lord Venkateswara of which only about 12,000 are available today. He is also the author of musical treatise called "Sankirthana lakshanamu".

Annamayya considered his compositions as floral offerings to Venkateswara. In the poems, he praises the deity, describes his love for him, argues and quarrels with the Lord, confesses the devotee's failures and apprehensions, and surrenders himself to Venkateshwara. His songs are classified into the Adhyaatma (spiritual) and Sringaara (romantic) sankeertanas genres. His songs in the "Sringaara" genre worship Venkateswara by describing the romantic adventures of Venkateshwara and his consort Alamelu, while others describe the Bhakti of his devotees.

In his later keertanas, he espouses subjects such as morality, dharma and righteousness. He was one of the first few who opposed the social stigma towards the untouchable castes in his era, with his sankeertanas explaining that the relationship between God and human is the same irrespective of the latter's color, caste and financial status, in his songs "Brahmaṃ Okkatē Paraḥbrahmamokkatē" and "ē kulajuḍainanēmi evvaḍainanēmi". His prodigious literary career earned him a place among the all-time greats of Telugu literature.

Legacy 

While he enjoyed popularity in his days, his compositions were forgotten for over three centuries. Mentioned in 1849, they were later found engraved on copper plates, hidden for centuries inside the Sri Venkateswara temple at Tirumala, just opposite the Hundi, concealed in a very small room. An English translation of 150 of these verses was published in 2005.

Tirumala Tirupati Devasthanams, also known as TTD, has been endeavoring to preserve the rich heritage of his compositions. In the year 1950, The State Government of Andhra Pradesh created a committee and appointed the legendary musician late Dr. M. Balamuralikrishna as its head. He set music to over 800 compositions of Annamacharya and are still popular among the devotees. He was the Āsthāna Gāyaka of the Tirumala temple at Tirupati for two decades. He is regarded as a legend in rendering devotional music in classical style, especially the Annamacharya Sankirtanas. He was also an acclaimed poet, singer, and a musicologist. In 1979, the legendary singer Smt. M. S. Subbulakshmi's album Balaji Pancharatna Mala came up with Annamacharya keerthanas like Vande Vasudevam, Bhavamulona, Sriman Narayana and many more. This became a hit and  took the compositions of Annamacharya to every nook and corner of the country.

Shobha Raju is the first recipient of Tirumala Tirupati Devasthanams scholarship in 1976 to study and set a trend for the propagation of Annamacharya's compositions, and was also chosen as the first exclusive artiste for the propagation of Tallapaka's compositions in 1978. Her first audio album, "Vēnkatēśvara Gīta Mālika" is globally popular among Telugu community. She is the founder of Annamacharya Bhavana Vahini (ABV) in 1983, which is located in Hyderabad, India. She has been awarded Padmashri by Government of India, in 2010 in recognition of her efforts to promote Annamayya Compositions. Sri Garimella Balakrishna Prasad, a Carnatic music exponent and the asthana vidwan of Tirumala Tirupati Devasthanams has set tune to more than six hundred songs written by Annamacharya, gave audio recordings for TTD, published books with musical notations and conducted classes, teaching the songs to make them more popular.

In 1994, reputed Bharathanatyam artist Parvathi Ravi Ghantasala, also the daughter in law of the legendary singer Ghantasala Venkateswara Rao, for the first time produced and presented a mammoth dance production as a tribute to the divine composer titled "Annamaiyah". Rare and popular songs were woven into a story format and music by legendary stalwarts was set to action. This production was inaugurated by the former President of India R. Venkatraman and Bharat Ratna-winning singer M. S. Subbulakshmi and later that year for the Tirumala Brahmotsavam. The production went on to become a sensational hit and more dancers of different forms started choreographing for the saints' composition. Based on popular demand in 2009, a DVD of the production was also launched which included several places visited by the saint himself. The production has traveled across the US, Europe, and Asia and staged over 400 times until now.

A Telugu film named Annamayya was made on him by K. Raghavendra Rao in 1997. It starred Nagarjuna in the lead role as Annamacharya and also featured Suman as Lord Venkateshwara and Bhanupriya as Goddess Padmavathi Devi in important roles. The film became a huge blockbuster and was the highest grosser of the year in Telugu cinema.

In 2017, one of Annamayya's compositions, Brahmam Okate, became a YouTube sensation. As of early-2019, this video alone (produced by Kuldeep M. Pai) has garnered over 11 million views and made the child singers Sooryagayathri and Rahul Vellal household names for their flawless rendering of the classic keerthana. Professional singers P. Unnikrishnan and Sreeranjini Kodampally have their performances of the composition on YouTube.

Famous compositions
This is a partial list of some of the most famous Tallapaka Annamacharya compositions.
 Note – (చ=Ca; ఛ=Cha; శ=Śa; ష=Ṣ. For more see Romanization of Telugu)

అన్నమయ్య పాటలు (All Annamayya songs lyrics in Telugu Script)

See also
 List of Carnatic composers
 Annamacharya sankeertana
 List of composers who created ragas

References

Further reading
 Jackson, William. 'Religious and Devotional Music: Southern Area' (1999). In

External links

 Sri Annamacharya Project of North America
 Sri Venkateswara Annamacharya Society of America

Carnatic composers
Hindu poets
Telugu poets
History of Andhra Pradesh
Tirumala Venkateswara Temple
Bhakti movement
1408 births
1503 deaths
People from Rayalaseema
People from Kadapa district
15th-century Indian poets
15th-century Indian musicians
Indian male classical musicians
Indian male composers
Musicians from Andhra Pradesh
Poets from Andhra Pradesh
Indian male poets
Kirtan performers